Podocarpus confertus is a species of conifer in the family Podocarpaceae. It is endemic to Borneo.

Podocarpus confertus grows in kerangas forest on poor, sandy soils and in stunted forest on ultrabasic rocks, from 100 and 1,200 meters elevation. It can form dense stands, or grow in mixed forests with other coniferous and broadleaf trees and shrubs.

References

confertus
Endemic flora of Borneo
Trees of Borneo
Least concern plants
Taxonomy articles created by Polbot
Taxa named by David John de Laubenfels